Maja Vučurović (Serbian Cyrillic: Маја Вучуровић; born May 27, 1991) is a Serbian professional basketball player. Maja plays for Stars Keltern in the Bundesliga and EuroCup.

External links
Profile at eurobasket.com

https://celtabaloncesto.com/ligafemenina2/maja-stamenkovic-calidad-y-caracter-para-celta-zorka-recalvi/

https://www.elcorreo.com/deporte-femenino-alava/baloncesto/araski/caracter-serbio-campus-20200220225617-nt_amp.html

References 

1991 births
Living people
People from Senta
Serbian women's basketball players
ŽKK Radivoj Korać players
Point guards
Serbian expatriate basketball people in Belgium
Serbian expatriate basketball people in Ecuador
Serbian expatriate basketball people in France
Serbian expatriate basketball people in Germany
Serbian expatriate basketball people in Poland
Serbian expatriate basketball people in Romania
Serbian expatriate basketball people in the Czech Republic
Serbian expatriate basketball people in Spain